The non-marine molluscs of Belize are a part of the molluscan fauna of Belize (wildlife of Belize). A number of species of non-marine molluscs are found in the wild in Belize.

Freshwater gastropods

Land gastropods

Cyclophoridae
 Neocyclotus dysoni (Pfeiffer 1849)

Helicinidae
 Lucidella lirata (Pfeiffer 1847)
 Helicina arenicola (Morelet 1849)
 Helicina oweniana (Pfeiffer 1849)
 Helicina amoena (Pfeiffer 1849)
 Pyrgodomus microdinus (Morelet 1851)

Sagdidae
 Xenodiscula taintori (Goodrich & Van der Schalie 1973)

Subulinidae
 Beckianum beckianum (Pfeiffer 1846)

Helicarionidae
 Guppya gundlachi (Pfeiffer 1846)

Orthalicidae
 Orthalicus princeps (Broderip 1833)
 Bulimulus unicolor (Sowerby 1833)
 Drymaeus sulfureus (Pfeiffer 1856)

Zonitidae
 Hawaiia minuscula (A. Binney 1840)

Urocoptidae
 Brachypodella speluncae (Morelet 1852)
 Microceramus concisus (Morelet 1849)

Eucalodiidae
 Eucalodium belizensis Thompson & Dourson, 2013

Helicodiscidae
 Chanomphalus pilsbryi (H.B. Baker 1927)

Carychiidae
 Carychium belizeense Jochum & Weigand in Jochum et al., 2017

Thysanophoridae
 Thysanophora plagioptycha (Shuttleworth 1854)

Pupillidae
 Sterkia eyriesii (Drouet 1859)

Pomatiidae
 Chondropoma rubicundum (Morelet 1849)

Spiraxidae
 Euglandina ghiesbreghti (Pfeiffer 1846)

Vertiginidae
 Gastrocopta pentodon (Say 1822)

Helminthoglyptidae
 Trichodiscina coactiliata (Fèrussac 1838)

Freshwater bivalves

See also

 List of marine molluscs of Belize
 List of non-marine molluscs of Mexico
 List of non-marine molluscs of Guatemala

References

Molluscs
Belize
Belize